Rebecca M. Henderson, FBA is an American economist, currently the John and Natty McArthur University Professor at Harvard Business School.

She teaches Reimagining Capitalism in the Master of Business Administration (MBA) Program.

From 1998 to 2009, Professor Henderson was the Eastman Kodak Professor of Management at the Sloan School of the Massachusetts Institute of Technology. She received an undergraduate degree in mechanical engineering from MIT and a doctorate in business economics from Harvard.

Honours
In July 2017, Henderson was elected a Corresponding Fellow of the British Academy (FBA), the United Kingdom's national academy for the humanities and social sciences.

References

Year of birth missing (living people)
Living people
Harvard Business School faculty
American economists
Massachusetts Institute of Technology alumni
Harvard University alumni
Corresponding Fellows of the British Academy
American business theorists
Fellows of the American Academy of Arts and Sciences